Majid Mahmud Abdu Ahmad is a citizen of Yemen who was held in extrajudicial detention in the United States Guantanamo Bay detainment camps, in Cuba.
His Guantanamo Internee Security Number is 41.
The Department of Defense reports that he was born on June 15, 1980, in Al Buraiqeh District, Yemen.

He was transferred to United Arab Emirates, with fourteen other men, on August 15, 2016.

Inconsistent identification
Ahmad was named inconsistently on official documents released by the Department of Defense.
 He was named Majid Mahmud Abdu Ahmad in the Summary of Evidence memo prepared for his Combatant Status Review Tribunal, on 21 September 2004.
 He was named Majid Abdu Ahmed on the Summary of Evidence memo prepared for his first annual Administrative Review Board, on November 13, 2005.
 He was named Majid M Abdu Ahmed on the Summary of Evidence memo prepared for his second annual Administrative Review Board, on September 26, 2006.

Official status reviews

Originally the Bush Presidency asserted that captives apprehended in the "war on terror" were not covered by the Geneva Conventions, and could be held indefinitely, without charge, and without an open and transparent review of the justifications for their detention.
In 2004, the United States Supreme Court ruled, in Rasul v. Bush, that Guantanamo captives were entitled to being informed of the allegations justifying their detention, and were entitled to try to refute them.

Office for the Administrative Review of Detained Enemy Combatants

Following the Supreme Court's ruling the Department of Defense set up the Office for the Administrative Review of Detained Enemy Combatants.

Scholars at the Brookings Institution, led by Benjamin Wittes, listed the captives still held in Guantanamo in December 2008, according to whether their detention was justified by certain common allegations:

 Majid Mahmud Abdu Ahmad  was listed as one of the captives who "The military alleges ... are fighters for the Taliban."
 Majid Mahmud Abdu Ahmad  was listed as one of the captives who "The military alleges ... traveled to Afghanistan for jihad."
 Majid Mahmud Abdu Ahmad  was listed as one of the captives who "The military alleges that the following detainees stayed in Al Qaeda, Taliban or other guest- or safehouses."
 Majid Mahmud Abdu Ahmad  was listed as one of the captives who "The military alleges ... took military or terrorist training in Afghanistan."
 Majid Mahmud Abdu Ahmad  was listed as one of the captives who "The military alleges ... fought for the Taliban."
 Majid Mahmud Abdu Ahmad  was listed as one of the captives who "The military alleges ... were at Tora Bora."
 Majid Mahmud Abdu Ahmad  was listed as one of the captives who "The military alleges that the following detainees were captured under circumstances that strongly suggest belligerency."
 Majid Mahmud Abdu Ahmad  was listed as one of the captives who "The military alleges ... served on Osama Bin Laden’s security detail."
 Majid Mahmud Abdu Ahmad  was listed as one of the captives who was an "al Qaeda operative".
 Majid Mahmud Abdu Ahmad  was listed as one of the "82 detainees made no statement to CSRT or ARB tribunals or made statements that do not bear materially on the military’s allegations against them."

Habeas corpus petition

He has had a habeas corpus petition released on his behalf.:
A dossier of unclassified documents from his tribunal was released in 2005.

Formerly secret Joint Task Force Guantanamo assessment

On April 25, 2011, whistleblower organization WikiLeaks published formerly secret assessments drafted by Joint Task Force Guantanamo analysts.
His twelve-page Joint Task Force Guantanamo assessment was drafted on February 24, 2008.
It was signed by camp commandant Rear Admiral Mark H. Buzby.
He recommended continued detention.

References

Yemeni extrajudicial prisoners of the United States
Detainees of the Guantanamo Bay detention camp
Living people
1980 births